Robin Clemens Benzing (born 1 May 1989) is a German professional basketball player for Peñarol of the LUB. He is also a member of the Germany national basketball team.

Professional career
Benzing played in Germany with TV Langen in the second-tier TV Langen until 2009. In 2008, he had signed a letter of intent with the University of Michigan, but eventually did not join the Wolverines due to NCAA initial eligibility requirements.

From 2009 to 2011, Benzing played for Ratiopharm Ulm in Germany's Basketball Bundesliga, followed by a four-year stint at Bayern Munich. On 30 June 2015 he signed a two-year deal with CAI Zaragoza of the Spanish Liga ACB. After two years playing in Spain, he returned to his home country in September 2017, signing a three-year contract with S.Oliver Würzburg. Benzing averaged 17.2 points and 4.1 rebounds per game in the 2017-18 season. On 4 September he signed a one-month deal with Beşiktaş, with an option for nine additional months.

On 27 July 2019 he signed a one-year deal with Casademont Zaragoza of the Liga ACB. Benzing re-signed with the team on 11 June 2020.

On 10 August 2021 Benzig signed with Fortitudo Bologna in the Italian Lega Basket Serie A.

In November 2022, Benzing joined Peñarol of the Liga Uruguaya de Básquetbol (LUB).

German national team
Benzing has been a member of the German national under-18 and German national under-20 teams. He played in the 2007 FIBA Europe Under-18 Championship and the 2009 FIBA Europe Under-20 Championship, where he was the tournament's leading scorer with 22.2 points per game. In 2009, he made his debut for the senior Germany national basketball team in the EuroBasket 2009. He also played the EuroBasket 2011, 2013, 2015, 2017 and the 2010 FIBA World Championship.

In 2021, Benzing helped his national team to qualify for the 2020 Summer Olympics (which were postponed due to the COVID-19 pandemic). He scored 13 points in the qualifying tournament's final, in a 75-64 victory against Brazil.

Career statistics

EuroLeague

|-
| style="text-align:left;"| 2013–14
| style="text-align:left;" rowspan="2"| Bayern Munich
| 24 || 15 || 16.1 || .427 || .352 || .872 || 1.8 || .6 || .6 || .1 || 6.4 || 4.5
|-
| style="text-align:left;"| 2014–15
| 8 || 8 || 21.9 || .431 || .381 || .786 || 2.6 || .9 || .8 || .4 || 7.9 || 7.8
|- class="sortbottom"
| colspan=2 style="text-align:center;"| Career
| 32 || 23 || 17.6 || .429 || .360 || .849 || 2.0 || .7 || .6 || .2 || 6.8 || 5.3

References

External links
Official website
Robin Benzing at draftexpress.com
Robin Benzing at eurobasket.com
Robin Benzing at euroleague.net

1989 births
Living people
2010 FIBA World Championship players
2019 FIBA Basketball World Cup players
Basketball players at the 2020 Summer Olympics
Basket Zaragoza players
Beşiktaş men's basketball players
FC Bayern Munich basketball players
Fortitudo Pallacanestro Bologna players
German expatriate basketball people in Spain
German expatriate basketball people in Turkey
German men's basketball players
Liga ACB players
Olympic basketball players of Germany
Power forwards (basketball)
Ratiopharm Ulm players
Small forwards
S.Oliver Würzburg players
Club Atlético Peñarol basketball players